Mohamad Ezanie bin Mat Salleh (born 18 April 1995) is a Malaysian professional footballer who plays as a right-back for Sri Pahang.

Career statistics

Club

References

External links
 

1995 births
Living people
People from Perak
Malaysian footballers
PKNP FC players
Felda United F.C. players
Sri Pahang FC players
Malaysia Super League players
Malaysia Premier League players
Association football defenders